Dulton Keith Adams is a South African politician. He has been serving as a Member of the Gauteng Provincial Legislature since 22 May 2019. He is a member of the African Christian Democratic Party (ACDP) and the party's sole representative in the provincial legislature.

References

External links
Dulton Keith Adams – People's Assembly

Year of birth missing (living people)
Living people
Members of the Gauteng Provincial Legislature
People from Gauteng
South African politicians
20th-century South African politicians
21st-century South African politicians
African Christian Democratic Party politicians